The Mason Cup is the trophy awarded to the champion of the CCHA Men's Ice Hockey Tournament, the postseason championship event of the Central Collegiate Hockey Association, an NCAA Division I college ice hockey league. The Cup was awarded from 2001 until the original CCHA folded at the end of the 2012–13 season.

The CCHA was revived in 2020 by seven schools that had previously announced plans to leave the Western Collegiate Hockey Association at the end of the 2020–21 season, with an eighth school being invited shortly thereafter. On May 19, 2021, the new CCHA announced that the Mason Cup would return for the 2021–22 season as the championship trophy for the revived CCHA tournament.

History
The cup was created in honor of Ron Mason, who coached three separate CCHA teams but is most remembered for his time at Michigan State. Mason ended his coaching career in 2002 and, at the time of his retirement, was the winningest coach in NCAA history with 924 victories.

Winners

See also
CCHA Men's Ice Hockey Tournament
List of CCHA Men's Ice Hockey Tournament champions

References

External links
CCHA official site

Central Collegiate Hockey Association
College ice hockey trophies and awards in the United States